Carterway Heads is a hamlet in Northumberland, England. It is situated between Consett and the Derwent Reservoir, at the intersection of the A68 and B6278 roads.

Governance 
Carterway Heads is in the parliamentary constituency of Hexham.

References

Villages in Northumberland